Ieuan (pronounced "YIGH-in" ) Rees (born about 1941) is a veteran stone cutter, artist, teacher and YouTube personality from Ammanford, Wales.



Education and early life 

Ieuan Rees has designed stone carvings for the Vicar of Dibley TV series, for opening titles in other UK comedies and has designed works for public buildings including the Senedd in Cardiff, Wales.

Recent fame 
Ieuan Rees's most recent claim to fame is via the "Best Unintentional ASMR" channel on YouTube. This YouTube video came about due to a project from "Artisan Media" in 2012. They had intended on video taping artists at work and selling the videos, however,  he was "too niche" so they uploaded it to YouTube and abandoned the project, as did Rees himself. It would be eventually picked up by a YouTube channel known as "Best Unintentional ASMR" where it would go  on to gather more than 5.4 million  views, spawn a "GoFundMe" campaign, and get him interviewed by the BBC, The South Wales Guardian and Inside Edition.

Works

References

External links
Official website

1941 births
20th-century calligraphers
21st-century calligraphers
Autonomous sensory meridian response
Living people
Stonemasons
Welsh artists
Welsh calligraphers
Year of birth uncertain
People from Ammanford